Cássio Horta Magalhães also called Cassio (Coronel Fabriciano, 20 August 1990) is a Brazilian footballer who plays for Myanmar side Ayeyawady United.

References

External links
 

Brazilian footballers
Swiss Super League players
FC Thun players
1990 births
Living people
Expatriate footballers in Switzerland
Expatriate footballers in Bosnia and Herzegovina
NK Travnik players
Myanmar National League players
Expatriate footballers in Myanmar
Ayeyawady United F.C. players
Association football forwards